Joshua D. Maurer (born February 26, 1964) is an American film producer, writer and actor whose credits include Georgia O'Keeffe, The Hoax, The Last Tycoon, Rosemary's Baby, Jodi Arias: Dirty Little Secret and Introducing Dorothy Dandridge.

Life and career
Maurer grew up in West Orange, New Jersey, where he attended West Orange High School. A graduate of Sarah Lawrence College, he received his B.A. in history and drama while he trained professionally with Academy Award winner Olympia Dukakis. Maurer was nominated twice within the same year and category for the David L. Wolper Producer of the Year Award for Longform Television. He is married to fellow producer Alixandre Witlin. The two share two daughters.

As an actor, he is best known for his portrayal of Private Roger Horn in the CBS television series Tour of Duty and  television movies.

Awards and nominations

Filmography

References

External links
 
 
 PGA Award Winners

Film producers from New Jersey
Living people
Sarah Lawrence College alumni
Screenwriters from New Jersey
1964 births
Male actors from New Jersey
People from West Orange, New Jersey
West Orange High School (New Jersey) alumni
Television producers from New Jersey